The Gulf wobbegong or banded wobbegong (Orectolobus halei) is a species of carpet shark in the family Orectolobidae, found in southern Australia between Southport, Queensland and Norwegian Bay, Western Australia.

Orectolobus halei is very similar to the ornate wobbegong, O. ornatus, of which it was treated as a synonym until 2006. Despite this, genetic evidence suggests that O. halei is more closely related to the largely sympatric spotted wobbegong, O. maculatus, than either are to the generally more northern O. ornatus.

Compared to O. ornatus, O. halei has more dermal lobes at the posterior preorbital group, a shorter pelvic fin to anal fin interspace, larger pectoral fins, a larger head and larger claspers when mature.

Reproduction is ovoviviparous.

Etymology
The shark is named in honor of Herbert M. Hale (1895-1963) then the Director of the South Australian Museum.

Conservation Status
As of October 31, 2021, O. halei has been categorized as Fully Recovered by the IUCN.

See also
 List of sharks

References

Gulf wobbegong
Fish of Australia
Marine fish of Southern Australia
Taxa named by Gilbert Percy Whitley
Gulf wobbegong